David Lloyd may refer to:

Entertainment
 David Lloyd (biographer) (1635–1692), author of Lloyd's Memoirs of Excellent Personages
 David Lloyd (tenor) (1912–1969), British tenor
 David Lloyd (writer) (1934–2009), American television writer
 David Lloyd (comics) (born 1950), illustrator of the graphic novel V for Vendetta
 David Lloyd (actor) (born 1955), English actor and screenwriter
 David Lloyd (broadcaster), British radio broadcaster
 David Lloyd (musician), singer with Uropa Lula
 David Lloyd (sportscaster), SportsCenter anchor for ESPN

Sports
 David Lloyd (footballer, born 1872), for Thames Ironworks
 David Lloyd (footballer, born 1928) (1928–2000), for York City
 David Lloyd (riflemaker and sportsman) (1910–1996)
 David Lloyd (cricketer), (born 1947), known as "Bumble", England Test cricketer, coach, and commentator
 David Lloyd (cricketer, born 1992), Glamorgan cricketer
 Dave Lloyd (American football) (1936–2014), former National Football League player
 David Lloyd (tennis) (born 1948), founder of the David Lloyd Tennis Clubs
 Dave Lloyd (cyclist) (born 1949), and coach
 David Lloyd (squash player) (born 1965)

Other
 David Lloyd (Dean of St Asaph) (1597–1663), Welsh cleric and author of The Legend of Captain Jones
 David Lloyd (priest) (c. 1688–1747?), Welsh cleric and translator
 David Lloyd (judge) (1656–1731), chief justice of colonial Pennsylvania
 David Lloyd (botanist) (1937–2006), New Zealand plant scientist and victim of poisoning scandal
 David Lloyd (diplomat) (born 1940), British ambassador to Slovenia
 David Lloyd (Welsh politician) (born 1956), Welsh politician
 David Lloyd (chemist) (born 1974), Irish chemist and Vice Chancellor of the University of South Australia
 David Lloyd (academic), professor of English and political activist
 David Lloyd (police commissioner), British police commissioner
 David Lloyd Leisure, a franchise of gym and racquet clubs in UK and western Europe

See also
David Lloyd Jones (disambiguation)
David Lloyd George (1863–1945), Prime Minister of the United Kingdom during World War I
Gareth David-Lloyd (born 1981), actor who plays Ianto in the television series Torchwood